The National Sports Council is an organisation in Bangladesh.

National Sports Council may also refer to:
 Botswana National Sports Council
National Sports Council (Nepal)
National Sports Council of Zambia
Consejo Superior de Deportes, in English National Sports Council. Spanish Sports Agency.
National Sports Council (Brazil) (Conselho Nacional de Desportos), Brazilian sports governing body